The Linkou Line was a railway branch line in Taiwan operated by the Taiwan Railways Administration. It was located in Taoyuan County and New Taipei City. The Linkou line was suspended for operation in December 2012.

History
The railroad was originally built to transport coal to the Linkou Power Plant and was opened on January 1, 1968. But owing to the traffic policy of Taoyuan County, the local government made this line available for passenger service on October 27, 2005.

Passenger service on the Linkou Line ended on December 28, 2012, followed by freight services on December 31, 2012, due to the grade-separation of the northern section of the TRA Taiwan Trunk Line.

Services
While still in operation, service was only on work days, excluding government holidays.

Stations

References

External links

Taoyuan County government website describing Taolin Railroad

2005 establishments in Taiwan
2012 disestablishments in Taiwan
3 ft 6 in gauge railways in Taiwan
Former buildings and structures in Taiwan